Order fulfillment (in British English: order fulfilment) is in the most general sense the complete process from point of sales inquiry to delivery of a product to the customer. Sometimes, it describes the more narrow act of distribution or the logistics function. In the broader sense, it refers to the way firms respond to customer orders.

Classification
The first research towards defining order fulfillment strategies was published by Hans Wortmann, and was continued by Hal Mather in his discussion of the P:D ratio, whereby P is defined as the production lead time, i.e. how long it takes to manufacture a product, and D is the demand lead time. D can be viewed as:

 The lead time quoted by the firm to the customer
 The lead time the customer wishes it was
 The competitive lead time

Based on comparing P and D, a firm has several basic strategic order fulfillment options:

 Engineer-to-order (ETO) - (D>>P) Here, the product is designed and built to customer specifications; this approach is most common for large construction projects and one-off products, such as Formula 1 cars.
 Build-to-order (BTO); syn: Make-to-Order (MTO) - (D>P) Here, the product is based on a standard design, but component production and manufacture of the final product is linked to the order placed by the final customer's specifications; this strategy is typical for high-end motor vehicles and aircraft.
 Assemble-to-order (ATO); syn: Assemble-to-request - (D<P) Here, the product is built to customer specifications from a stock of existing components. This assumes a modular product architecture that allows for the final product to be configured in this way; a typical example for this approach is Dell's approach to customizing its computers.
 Make-to-stock (MTS); syn: Build-to-Forecast (BTF) - (D=0) Here, the product is built against a sales forecast, and sold to the customer from finished goods stock; this approach is common in the grocery and retail sectors.
 Digital copy (DC) - (D=0, P=0) Where products are digital assets and inventory is maintained with a single digital master. Copies are created on-demand, downloaded and saved on customers' storage devices, such as research papers.

Processes
In the broader sense, the possible processes in a logistic-production system are:

 Product inquiry – Initial inquiry about offerings, visit to the web-site, catalog request
 Sales quote – Budgetary or availability quote
 Order configuration – Where ordered items need selection of options or order lines need to be compatible with each other
 Order booking – The formal order placement or closing of the deal (issuing by the customer of a Purchase Order)
 Order acknowledgment/confirmation – Confirmation that the order is booked and/or received
 Invoicing/billing – The presentment of the commercial invoice/bill to the customer
 Order sourcing/planning – Determining the source/location of item(s) to be shipped
 Order changes – Changes to orders, if needed
 Order processing – Process step where the distribution center or warehouse is responsible to fill order (receive and stock inventory, pick, pack and ship orders).
 Shipment – The shipment and transportation of the goods
 Track and trace – Determine the current and past locations of the goods during transit
 Delivery – The delivery of the goods to the consignee/customer
 Settlement – The payment of the charges for goods/services/delivery
 Returns – In case the goods are unacceptable/are not required

Strategic importance
The order fulfillment strategy also determines the de-coupling point in the supply chain, which describes the point in the system where the "push" (or forecast-driven) and "pull" (or demand-driven see Demand chain management) elements of the supply chain meet. The decoupling point always is an inventory buffer that is needed to cater for the discrepancy between the sales forecast and the actual demand (i.e. the forecast error).  Typically, the higher the P:D ratio, the more the firm relies on forecasts and inventories. Hal Mather suggests three ways to tackle this "planning dilemma":

Improve forecasting accuracy
Provide for flexibility
Build a process to recognize forecasting errors and quickly correct production planning

It has become increasingly necessary to move the de-coupling point in the supply chain to minimize the dependence on the forecast and to maximize the reactionary or demand-driven supply chain elements.  This initiative in the distribution elements of the supply chain corresponds to the Just-in-time initiatives pioneered by Toyota.

The order fulfillment strategy has also strong implications on how firms customize their products and deal with product variety. Strategies that can be used to mitigate the impact of product variety include modularity, option bundling, late configuration, and build to order (BTO) strategies—all of which are generally referred as mass customization strategies. The decoupling point can place a much stronger emphasis on the supply chain based on the process as well as the nature of supply chain configurations.

References

Freight transport
Inventory
Supply chain management